Misaki Doi and Jil Teichmann were the defending champions, but Doi chose not to participate. Teichmann played alongside Madison Brengle, but they lost in the first round to Quinn Gleason and Luisa Stefani.

Hayley Carter and Ena Shibahara won the title, defeating Taylor Townsend and Yanina Wickmayer in the final, 6–3, 7–6(7–1).

Seeds

Draw

Draw

References
Main Draw

Oracle Challenger Series – Newport Beach - Doubles
Oracle Challenger Series – Newport Beach